Róka is a Hungarian surname meaning "fox" (especially red fox). Notable people with the surname include:

 Antal Róka (1927–1970), Hungarian racewalker
 Charles Roka (1912–1999), Hungarian painter
 Maria Roka (born 1940), Hungarian sprint canoeist

See also 
 2058 Róka, main-belt asteroid

Hungarian-language surnames
Surnames from nicknames